Lu Pin may refer to:

 Lü Pin (activist) (born 1972), Chinese journalist and feminist activist
 Lu Pin (artist) (born 1972), Chinese sculptor
 Lü Pin (footballer) (born 1995), Chinese footballer